Tanahun District (or ),  a part of Gandaki Province, is one of the seventy-seven districts of Nepal. Previously the town of Bandipur was its district headquarter. This district lies in the middlemost of country Nepal. The postal code of Tanahun is 33900.

Bhanubhakta Acharya (Nepali: भानुभक्त आचार्य; 1814 – 1868) was a Nepalese poet and writer who translated the great epic Ramayana from Sanskrit to Khas language. His birthplace is Chundi Ramgha Tanahun Nepal. Bhanubhakta Acharya was born on 29 Ashar, 1871B.S. in Tanahun district of Nepal. Acharya was born to a Very Brahmin family and received education with a strong leaning towards religion from his grandfather at home. He is honored with the title Adikabi for the contributions he has made in the field of poetry and Khasi literature and every year, his birthday is celebrated as a festival of Bhanujayanti (29th of Ashad) by conducting various programs, usually academics and poem recitation. Chimkeswori is the highest hill of Tanahun.

Coordinates and location type
Latitude: 27.91667
Longitude:84.25
Latitude (DMS):27° 55' 0 N
Longitude  (DMS):84° 15' 0 E

Geography and climate

Major religious spots

 Vyash gufa, Damauli
 Pancha mandir, Damauli
 Thanithan, Basantapur
 Teen Khole Devi Mandir, Khairenitar-8 Jamdi
 Chabdi barahi, Chabdi
 Nirjala Mai, Turture
 Akala Mai, aanboo khaireni Rural Municipality
 Akala Mai Magde Rural Municipality
 Aadhi Mul
 Dhorbarahi, Dhorphirdi
 Khadga Devi Mandir, Bandipur
Devghat Tirtha isatal
 Chhimkeshwori Mai Mandir, Anbu Khaireni Rural Municipality
 Tanahun Kalika, Damauli
Siddha Gufa/Cave, (Biggest Cave of South Asia) Bimalnagar, Dumre, Bandipur Rural Municipality
Kalika Sthan Byas 8

Demographics

At the time of the 2011 Nepal census, Tanahun District had a population of 323,288.

As first language, 61.7% of these spoke Nepali, 21.0% Magar, 8.4% Gurung, 4.1% Newari, 1.2% Darai, 0.8% Urdu, 0.7% Tamang, 0.4% Bhojpuri 0.3% Bhujel, 0.3% Kumhali, 0.2% Bote, 0.1% Dura, 0.1% Hindi, 0.1% Maithili, 0.1% Rai, 0.1% Tharu and 0.1% other languages.

Ethnicity/caste: 27.1% were Magar, 11.8% Hill Brahmin, 11.6% Gurung, 11.5% Chhetri, 7.9% Kami, 7.7% Newar, 4.3% Sarki, 3.4% Damai/Dholi, 2.5% Gharti/Bhujel, 2.5% Kumal, 2.3% Thakuri, 1.3% Darai, 1.3% Musalman, 1.3% Tamang, 0.6% Sanyasi/Dasnami, 0.5% Badi, 0.4% Bote, 0.3% Dura, 0.2% other Dalit, 0.2% Majhi, 0.2% Rai, 0.1% Chepang/Praja, 0.1% Gaine, 0.1% Sunuwar, 0.1% Tharu, 0.1% Yadav and 0.2% others.

Religion: 86.5% were Hindu, 9.4% Buddhist, 1.7% Christian, 1.3% Muslim, 0.5% Bon, 0.2% Prakriti and 0.4% others.

Literacy: 74.6% could read and write, 1.9% could only read, and 23.4% could neither read nor write.

Administration
The district consists of 10 Municipalities, out of which four are urban municipality and six are rural municipalities. These are as follows:
Bhanu Municipality
Bhimad Municipality
Byas Municipality
Shuklagandaki Municipality
Anbu Khaireni Rural Municipality
Devghat Rural Municipality
Bandipur Rural Municipality
Rishing Rural Municipality
Ghiring Rural Municipality
Myagde Rural Municipality

Former Village Development Committees 
Prior to the restructuring of the district, Tanahun District consisted of the following municipalities and Village development committees:

Anbu Khaireni Municipality
Arunodaya
Baidi
Bhanumati
Bhirkot
Bhirlung
Chhang
Chhimkeshwari
Chhipchhipe
Chok Chisapani
Deurali
Dharampani
Gajarkot
Ghansikuwa
Jamune Bhanjyang
Kabilas
Kahu Shivapur
Keshavtar
Kihun
Kota
Kotdarbar
Kyamin9  vyas marg damouli to pattal 
Majhakot
Manpang
Phirphire
Purkot
Raipur
Ramjakot
Ranipokhari
Risti
Rupakot
Satiswara
Sundhara
Syamgha
Tanahunsur
Thaprek

See also

 Western Region Campus
 Bhanubhakta Acharya
 Nara Nath Acharya
 Bandipur: The Queen of Hills of Nepal

References

 

 
Gandaki Province
Districts of Nepal established in 1962